In mathematics, Cayley's Ω process, introduced by , is a relatively invariant differential operator on the general linear group, that is used to construct invariants of a group action.

As a partial differential operator acting on functions of n2 variables xij, the omega operator is given by the determinant

The r-fold Ω process Ωr(f, g) on two forms f and g in the variables x and y is then
 Convert f to a form in x1, y1 and g to a form in x2, y2
 Apply the Ω operator r times to the function fg, that is, f times g in these four variables
 Substitute x for x1 and x2, y for y1 and y2 in the result

The result of the r-fold Ω process Ωr(f, g) on the two forms f and g is also called the r-th transvectant and is commonly written (f, g)r.

Applications
Cayley's Ω process appears in Capelli's identity, which 
 used  to find generators for the invariants of various classical groups acting on natural polynomial algebras.

 used Cayley's Ω process in his proof of finite generation of rings of invariants of the general linear group. His use of the Ω process gives an explicit formula for  the Reynolds operator of the special linear group.

Cayley's Ω process  is used to define transvectants.

References
 Reprinted in 

Invariant theory